Jwaydan Moyine is a British, classically trained singer and composer of Middle eastern, Circassian, and East European descent. She is most known for her collaboration with renowned Egyptian trance duo Aly & Fila. The critically acclaimed "We Control The Sunlight", initially composed by her as an acoustic song, appeared on the Armin Van Buuren show, A State of Trance.

Education
Jwaydan was born and raised in the United Kingdom. She studied at the Guildhall School of Music and Drama, graduating as a classical composer, pianist, and cellist. Although initially a pianist/cellist, she gravitated toward classical composition and production and trained to become a composer of Film music. She cites her parents' inclination towards classical music as a pivotal inspiration in her development as a musician. Notable musical influences include composers such as Mozart, Tchaikovsky as well as Enya. Jwaydan began to sing and play piano at an early age. By the time she was eight years old, she had started performing as a pianist at festivals around the UK, including Wantage and Oxford. At fifteen, she won a scholarship to study as a cellist and a film composer at the Guildhall School of Music and Drama. She soon after began to work in the music industry as a songwriter for mainstream artists before refocusing her attention on writing songs for her own material.

In an interview with trance sound, she expressed that she had a tough childhood growing up as a classically trained musician. Her parents banned pop music from the house, and only composers such as Beethoven, Chopin, Stravinsky, and other classical giants were permitted as far as music was concerned.

"My parents really wanted me to become this world-class performer the moment I was old enough to play the piano. I remember doing very little else other than sitting in front of a musical instrument and training for sometimes up to six hours a day. That's just normal in the classical world of music. There was a lot of pressure put on me from as young as five years old to practice the piano and cello, enter competitions, win, and repeat. It was an unusual childhood because of the high expectations and the lack of freedom permitted to walk my own path. But I also think it's the only reason I'm as obsessively driven and relentless with music and other creative ventures as I am now. Being a musician and especially a singer is one of the hardest and most brutal careers out there, and it requires tremendous strength, courage, grit, and training to pull it off, especially in the way that you want."

"I think the fact I trained as a classical composer at a conservatoire such as the Guildhall, and was educated to write all my ideas independently has made a huge difference in terms of how well I can shape my musical ideas. People often state that music is not something that can be taught, and I believe that to be true, but I think having a rigorous musical education and upbringing has allowed me to have a lot more control over how my music unfolds, enabling me to get fully involved with the collaborations I do rather than just putting my vocals to something that I didn’t create which I would never allow. I think singers need to feel what they are singing about, and you can only accomplish such a thing if you've lived, bled, suffered, and survived through a particular experience."

Jwaydan is a noted talent from within the electronic dance music scene. She came to the attention of award-winning Paul Van Dyk's closest colleagues, who stated "after being in the industry for 20 years and not once have I come across a singer who is so multi-talented, and not average at what she does, outstandingly good at all of them". She gained attention from the likes of Armin Van Buuren, Paul Oakenfold, Gareth Emery, Markus Schulz becoming one of the most played singers in the electronic dance music scene on the radio for 2011. Outside of EDM, she has worked as a songwriter with producers whose involvement include artists such as Jessie J, Pixie Lott, Plan B, Demi Lovato, JoJo and Chipmunk.

Career
Jwaydan garnered considerable attention when she collaborated with Aly & Fila to release the critically acclaimed track "We Control the Sunlight". It went viral and eventually won the official tune of the year award from Armin van Buuren's  A State of Trance 2011, receiving 2,320 votes from listeners across the world. The compilation was released on March 17, went straight to No.1 in the iTunes dance charts in both the UK and the US, and debuted at No.2 in Canada, France Ireland, and Spain. WCTS gained a spot on the Beatport trance chart at No.1, No.1 on Audiojelly, No.1 on Armada Top 100 Download making it one of the highest-selling trance tracks of 2011. She wrote both the music and lyrics of "We Control The Sunlight" initially as an acoustic song she intended to use on her debut album. But the song became a collaboration between Jwaydan and Aly & Fila, and since its release has reached over forty million listeners with the support of radio plays and public performances.

Her second release, "Untouchable", was added to Sirius XM's playlist as one of the most played tracks on their dance music station for 2011. She wrote a second song for Aly & Fila "Coming home", added to Armin Van Buurens A State of Trance 2012, which charted at No.3 on Beatport. In 2013 she released "Until The End" with Moldavian artist Andrew Rayel which gained the No.1 spot on the Beatport Trance chart and No.70 on Beatport Top 100 Electronic Dance Music tracks, making it her third trance release in the Top 5 Beatport Trance. Her non-EDM releases include a song written for the Egyptian Revolution of 2011, "Standing our ground", composed by Jwaydan and produced by Mat Zo.

In 2010, she performed at some of the world's most popular clubs, including Pacha and Ibiza, opening for artists such as Tiësto and John Digweed. In 2011 she was invited to perform at the famous 'Miss world top model' beauty pageant held in Beirut, Lebanon, and more recently, invited to perform at Armin Van Buuren's ASOT 550 Den Bosch.

In 2014, she left her record label and management to pursue a career away from the electronic dance music scene, to returning to more acoustic-based music. Throughout 2014 her Facebook page was active with updates regarding the track list for her album. An acoustic preview of a song written and performed by Jwaydan "Castles" was published on her social media. There was no further information as to when the album would be released. On her Instagram account, she hinted at stepping back from music to redirect her attention toward creative writing, and particularly the creation and publication of several fantasy fiction books.

Jwaydan is the founder of the company Earth Children which raises awareness regarding environmental, animal welfare issues, and wellness-related matters. Since a young age, she has performed at several events throughout the UK and Europe to raise money for children in developing countries and support animal rescue centers such as Brook Hospital and ESMA, both located in Cairo. She is mainly involved with activism for animal welfare in the UK and child welfare in Syria, Thailand, and Romania.

Discography
 "We Control The Sunlight" (2011)
 "Untouchable" (2011)
 "Xantic" (2011)
 "Standing Our Ground: Song for the Egyptian Revolution" (2011)
 "Coming Home" (2012)
 "Until The End" (2013)

References

English electronic musicians
English women pop singers
Living people
Year of birth missing (living people)